Srđan Gemaljević (Serbian Cyrillic: Срђан Гемаљевић; born 20 July 1960) is a Serbian football coach and former player. He is fitness coach of Persepolis in Iran's Premier Football League.

Career

Playing career
 Red Star Belgrade
 OFK Beograd
 SV Türkgücü
 FC Memmingen

Coaching career
 ASV Felheim (1993–1996)
 SC Bregenz (1996–1998, Assistant)
 SC Bregenz (1998–2000)
 FR Yugoslavia national football team (Assistant) (2000–2001)
 FC Lustenau 07 (2001–2003)
 Esteghlal (Assistant) (2004–2005)
 Esteghlal Ahvaz (2005–2006)
 PAS Hamedan (Assistant) (2010)
 Persepolis (Assistant) (2011)

External links
 http://www.srdangemaljevic.com - official website
 http://srdangemaljevic.com/fa/ - Persian official website

Living people
1960 births
Serbian footballers
Association footballers not categorized by position
OFK Beograd players
Red Star Belgrade footballers
Serbian football managers
Expatriate football managers in Iran
Persepolis F.C. non-playing staff
Esteghlal Ahvaz F.C. managers